Mohammed Darweesh  (born 2 June 1991) is a Palestinian professional footballer who plays as a defensive midfielder for Hilal Al-Quds of the West Bank Premier League and for the Palestine national football team.

International career

Mohammed Darweesh became a key member of the Palestine national football team following the 2015 AFC Asian Cup. He earned his first cap in June 2015 in a 2018 FIFA World Cup qualification match against Saudi Arabia.

Darweesh played in all six of Palestine's 2019 AFC Asian Cup qualification matches helping Palestine qualify for the second ever finals tournament.

Achievements
 West Bank Premier League
Winner (3): 2014/15, 2016/17, 2017/18

 Palestine Cup
Winner (1):  2017–18

 Palestine Super Cup
Winner (1): 2018

 Yasser Arafat Cup
Winner (1): 2015

External links

References

1991 births
Living people
Israeli footballers
Palestinian footballers
Palestine international footballers
Association football midfielders
Footballers from Haifa District
Maccabi Haifa F.C. players
Sektzia Ness Ziona F.C. players
F.C. Ashdod players
Hakoah Maccabi Amidar Ramat Gan F.C. players
Hapoel Ashkelon F.C. players
Shabab Al-Dhahiriya SC players
Hilal Al-Quds Club players
Israeli Premier League players
Liga Leumit players
2019 AFC Asian Cup players
West Bank Premier League players